Powervar is an American company founded in 1986 by Peter Nystrom in Tustin, California which is now based in Waukegan, Illinois. Powervar manufactures power protection systems and equipment used in areas such as retail or medical industries. The company has presence in USA, Canada, Germany, UK, and the Middle East. In 2013 Powervar was acquired by AMETEK for $128 million. In that year the company had nearly $70 million in sales.

Products
Power Conditioners
Single-phase UPS
Three-phase UPS
Mobile power managers for mobile medical carts
Local area power centers, which includes a UPS system, MBS, and PDU
Communication line protectors
Other connectivity solutions

External links
Powervar webpage
Ametek website

References

Companies established in 1986
Companies based in Lake County, Illinois
Waukegan, Illinois